Valentine's Day is a 2010 American romantic comedy film directed by Garry Marshall. The screenplay and the story were written by Katherine Fugate, Abby Kohn, and Marc Silverstein. The film features an ensemble cast led by Jessica Alba, Kathy Bates, Jessica Biel, Bradley Cooper, Eric Dane, Patrick Dempsey, Héctor Elizondo, Jamie Foxx, Jennifer Garner, Topher Grace, Anne Hathaway, Carter Jenkins, Ashton Kutcher, Queen Latifah, Taylor Lautner, George Lopez, Shirley MacLaine, Emma Roberts, Julia Roberts, Bryce Robinson and Taylor Swift in her film acting debut. The film received negative reviews but was a box office success.

Plot
Florist Reed Bennett wakes up and proposes to his girlfriend Morley Clarkson, who accepts. However, Reed's closest friends, Alfonso Rodriguez and Julia Fitzpatrick, aren't surprised when Morley suddenly changes her mind and leaves Reed a few hours later.

On a flight to Los Angeles, Kate Hazeltine, a captain in the U.S. Army on a one-day leave, befriends Holden Wilson. Kate is travelling a long distance to get back home only for a short time, and Holden states that she must really be in love to do so. When the plane lands and Kate has to wait hours for the taxi, Holden offers his limousine to allow her to be there on time.

Julia, an elementary school teacher, has fallen in love with cardiothoracic surgeon Dr. Harrison Copeland, but does not know that he is married to Pamela. Harrison tells her that he needs to go to San Francisco for a business trip: on his way, he stops by at Reed's flower shop and orders two flower bouquets - asking for discretion. Julia books flight to surprise Harrison on his trip and is stopped by Reed at gate, where he tells Julia that Harrison is still married. Julia decides to not fly to San Francisco, and instead visits Harrison's LA Hospital where staff confirm he is married. Julia finds out where Harrison is dining at local restaurant, she dresses as a waitress and makes a scene at the restaurant, making Harrison's wife Pamela suspicious.

One of Julia's students, Edison orders flowers from Reed, to be sent to his teacher. Julia suggests to Edison to give the flowers to a girl named Rani in his class who has a crush on him after telling Edison the meaning of love.

Edison's babysitter Grace Smart is planning to lose her virginity to her boyfriend Alex Franklin. The planned encounter goes awry when Grace's mother discovers a naked Alex in Grace's room, rehearsing a song he wrote for Grace.

Edison's grandparents, Edgar and Estelle Paddington are facing the troubles of a long marriage. Estelle admits to Edgar about an affair she had with one of his business partners long ago. Although she is deeply sorry, Edgar is very upset.

Grace's high school friends, Willy Harrington and Felicia Miller are experiencing the freshness of new love and have agreed to wait to have sex.

Sean Jackson, a closeted gay professional football player, is contemplating the end of his career with his publicist Kara Monahan and his agent Paula Thomas. Kara is organizing her annual "I Hate Valentine's Day" party, but soon becomes interested in sports reporter Kelvin Moore, who was ordered to do a Valentine's Day report by his boss Susan Moralez, and who shares Kara's hatred of the holiday.

Substituting for Paula's absent secretary is one of the firm's receptionists, Liz Curran, who dates mail-room clerk Jason Morris. Jason is shocked when Liz turns out to be moonlighting as a phone sex operator. Liz explains that she is only doing this because she has a $100,000 student loan to pay off. Jason is upset, but eventually reconciles with her after seeing Edgar forgive Estelle.

Sean finally comes out on national television, and Holden, Sean's lover, goes back to him. Kate arrives home late at night to greet not her supposed boyfriend but her son Edison. Willy drops Felicia off at home after a date and they kiss. Kelvin and Kara hang out at Kelvin's news station where they later kiss. Alfonso dines with his wife, and Grace and Alex agree to wait to have sex. Edgar and Estelle reconcile and redo their marriage vows, Harrison's wife has left him because of his infidelity and Morley tries to call Reed, who is instead starting a new relationship with Julia. Paula receives a call from one of Liz's masochistic clients and takes delight in expressing her dominance and sadism.

Cast

In addition, amongst the plethora of brief cameo appearances, director Garry Marshall plays a violinist (his usual family crew of wife, son, daughter, grandchildren and niece also appear), singer Paul Williams provides opening and closing dialogue as a radio DJ, and ESPN sports journalist Hannah Storm plays herself.

Music

The score to Valentine's Day was composed by John Debney, who recorded his score with the Hollywood Studio Symphony at the Sony Scoring Stage. He also wrote a song for the film, "Every Time You Smiled", with award-winning lyricist Glen Ballard which was performed by Carina Round.

The movie's official soundtrack was released on February 9, 2010 via Big Machine Records. It features the movie's leading song, Jewel's "Stay Here Forever", which was released as a single on January 19, 2010 and has charted on the U.S. Billboard Hot Country Songs chart. The soundtrack also includes "Today Was a Fairytale" by Taylor Swift, which debuted at No. 2 on the U.S. Billboard Hot 100, breaking a record for highest first-week sales by a female artist. Swift's song "Jump Then Fall" from the Platinum edition of her album Fearless was also featured on the soundtrack. Debney's score album, including "Every Time You Smiled" (written by Debney and Glen Ballard, and not included on the song CD), was released digitally on April 7, 2010 by Watertower Music.

Jamie Foxx also recorded a song for the film which is called "Quit Your Job". It appears in the film but not on the soundtrack however, because of its vulgar lyrics. "I Gotta Feeling" by The Black Eyed Peas was used for the film's trailer.

Track listing for the score album:
 "The Proposal/Trying to Tell Her" – 2:20
 "The Makeup/First Kiss" – 2:25
 "Apartment Dwelling/Hollywood Loft" – 0:48
 "Arrival/Airport/Catching Julia/Gotta Stop Them" – 2:55
 "Flower Shop Talk/To the Restaurant/The Realization/Mi Familia" – 3:27
 "Light Conversation/Chivalrous Gestures/He's Married/Forget Me Not" – 3:25
 "Liz Leaves/Having Sex/I Have No Life" – 3:10
 "Julia Sees the Light/Edgar & Estelle/Young Love/First Time" – 3:31
 "She Said No/Don't Go/I Like Her" – 3:50
 "My Life's a Mess/This Is Awkward" – 1:22
 "Ride Home/Guys Talk" – 1:47
 "Mom's Home/Soccer Practice/Bike Ride" – 2:23
 "Reed and Julia" – 2:26
 "Valentine's Day" – 2:31
 "Every Time You Smiled" (Carina Round) – 2:53

Reception

Box office
The film debuted in the US on February 12, 2010 with $52.4 million its opening weekend, grabbing the number 1 spot over the holiday that shares its name. The film ousted two other high-profile openings; 20th Century Fox's action fantasy Percy Jackson & the Olympians: The Lightning Thief, which debuted at number 2 with $31.1 million over three days, and Universal's werewolf film The Wolfman, with $30.6 million. It is currently the third-highest opening weekend in February, and the second highest-grossing President's Day weekend film. 

On Monday, February 15, 2010, Valentine's Day went down to #2 behind Percy Jackson and the Olympians: The Lightning Thief, but then went back up #1 on Tuesday. On Friday, February 19, it went down to #2 behind Shutter Island then to #3 the next day. By Friday, February 26, it went down to #5 behind Shutter Island, The Crazies, Cop Out and Avatar. By March 18, it went down to #14. It stayed in theaters until May 6, 2010. With that record, it is the second biggest opening for a romantic comedy film behind Sex and the City with $57 million. 

The passing of the Valentine's Day holiday later had the film's box office results quickly declining with a total of $110 million in the United States and Canada as well as an additional $106 million overseas for a grand total of $216 million worldwide.

Critical response
 

Yahoo movies critics averaged the film's grade as a C−. Giving the film three out of four stars, the overall opinion of Carrie Rickey's review for The Philadelphia Inquirer is that "It is a pleasant, undemanding movie that takes place over 18 hours on V-Day and considers Very Attractive People whose romantic destinies converge, diverge, and cloverleaf like the interstates threading through California's Southland".

Betsy Sharkey of the Los Angeles Times commented that "The effect of all those spinning songs, stars and scenarios is merry-go-round-like, producing a sort of dizzying collage that no doubt some will adore, while others will just get nauseous...". British film critic Mark Kermode called the film a "greeting card full of vomit". 

Rene Rodriguez for the Miami Herald gave the film two out of four stars, describing the film as "surfing through the channels of an all-chick-flick cable service". Rodriguez also criticized the film's blandness, stating the film should have "shed some of its blander plotlines[…] and spent a little more time exploring the thrill and elation of being in love – or at least just being horny".
Slate movie critic Dana Stevens wrote that the film "lacks in charm, humor, and intelligence...".

Peter Travers of Rolling Stone gave the film one star out of four. Travers' analysis of the film simply states that "Valentine's Day is a date movie from hell".Jonathan Ross was not complimentary either on his Film 2010 show. He said "I thought the film was just awful". 

Valentine's Day is noted for sharing similarities with the British film Love Actually, particularly the basic premise of multiple storylines occurring around a popular holiday, and sometimes identical subplots. Many British bloggers and online critics described Valentine's Day as "an American copycat version of Love Actually, focusing on how Valentine's Day, like Love Actually, has an all-star cast whose characters' storylines intertwine with one another. 

Journalist Sady Doyle, in a hostile review for The Guardian, argued that Valentine's Day was the worst film ever made. Time named it one of the top 10 worst chick flicks.

Accolades

Home media

Valentine's Day was released on Region 1 DVD, iTunes and Blu-ray Disc on 18 May 2010.

See also
 New Year's Eve (2011 film)
 Mother's Day (2016 film)

References

External links
 
 

2010 films
2010 LGBT-related films
2010 romantic comedy films
American LGBT-related films
American romantic comedy films
2010s English-language films
Films about marriage
Films directed by Garry Marshall
Films scored by John Debney
Films set in Los Angeles
Films shot in Los Angeles
Golden Raspberry Award winning films
LGBT-related romantic comedy films
New Line Cinema films
Valentine's Day in films
Warner Bros. films
2010s American films
English-language romantic comedy films